The Catterline Cartie Challenge is a competition for homemade soapbox carts (or "carties", as they are known locally) held annually in Catterline, near Stonehaven, Scotland. It is part of the Catterline Gala Weekend and is held annually on the second weekend in June , with the carties being displayed at the gala on the Saturday and then time-trialed down the brae from the Creel Inn to the harbour the following day.

It was first held on 11/12 June 2005, when 11 carties were entered. The number of entries has grown in subsequent years, and in 2008 there were 26 carties taking part.

Prizes are awarded for the single fastest run (The Connons Shield), fastest aggregate time (Constructors Championship), Best Engineered, Best Decorated, Champagne Moment, Furthest Travelled, Cartie Sprint and "The Great Catterline Cartie Race".

The course is almost exactly 1000 ft (304.8m) long with a drop of almost 100 ft (30.5m) from start to finish, and the carties can reach speeds of around 30 mph at the finish line. As a result, the construction rules require the carties to have adequate brakes and steering. Other than these safety considerations, however, there are very few restrictions on the size and shape of the carties, and as a consequence there tends to be a wide range of designs entered, with many teams eschewing pure speed in favour of colourful novelty carties. These carties are very popular with the spectators and are often more memorable than the eventual winners.

Winners

2009

Connons Shield 

1st. The Cheats / Tequilla Slammer
2nd. A La Cartie / The Auld Alliance
3rd. Bervie Allstars / The Bervie Bomber

Constructors Trophy 

1st. The Cheats / Tequilla Slammer
2nd. Bitter and Twisted / Once a Fortnight
3rd. Team Weasel / The Flying Ferret

2008

Connons Shield 

1st. A La Cartie / The Auld Alliance
2nd. Firstdrive Cars / The Bandit
3rd. Team Riley / The Black Bomber

Constructors Trophy 

1st. Bitter and Twisted / Once a Fortnight
2nd. Firstdrive Cars / The Bandit
3rd. A La Cartie / The Auld Alliance

2007

Connons Shield 

1st. Chariots of Fire / Elijah
2nd. The Cheats / Tequilla Slammer
3rd. Firstdrive B / The Bandit

Constructors Trophy 

1st. Bitter and Twisted  / Once a Fortnight
2nd. Firstdrive Cars / The Bandit
3rd. Tequila Slammer MkIII / The Cheats

2006

Connons Shield 

1st. Bitter and Twisted / Once a Fortnight
2nd. A La Cartie / The Auld Alliance
3rd. The Cheats / Tequila Slammer

Constructors Trophy 

1st. The Cheats / Tequila Slammer
2nd. Firstdrive Cars / The Bandit
3rd. The Dragster / Checkpoint Racing

2005

Connons Shield 

1st. Chariots of Fire / Elijah
2nd. Team Scozzie / Creel Runnings
3rd. The Cheats / Tequilla Slammer

External links 
Catterline Cartie Challenge Home Page

Physical activity and dexterity toys
Toy cars and trucks
Racing